Bothriospila is a genus of beetles in the family Cerambycidae, and the type genus of the tribe Bothriospilini. It contains two species: the type, Bothriospila elegans, found in Brazil and Paraguay, and Bothriospila pulcherrima, found in Brazil. The latter was described as a new species from Brazil in 2012. Bothriospila was circumscribed in 1923 by Swedish entomologist Per Olof Christopher Aurivillius.

References

Bothriospilini
Beetle genera
Taxa named by Per Olof Christopher Aurivillius
Taxa described in 1923